Rainbow Bridge is a compilation album by American rock musician Jimi Hendrix. It was the second posthumous album release by his official record company and is mostly composed of recordings Hendrix made in 1969 and 1970 after the breakup of the Jimi Hendrix Experience.  Despite the cover photo and subtitle Original Motion Picture Sound Track, it does not contain any songs recorded during his concert appearance for the 1971 film Rainbow Bridge.

Continuing in the vein of The Cry of Love, the first official posthumous Hendrix album, Rainbow Bridge explores new guitar styles and textures.  All the songs, except for a solo studio version of "The Star-Spangled Banner", are written by Hendrix and mostly performed with Mitch Mitchell on drums and Billy Cox on bass.

Rainbow Bridge contains five songs that Hendrix included on proposed track listings for his fourth studio album: "Dolly Dagger", "Earth Blues", "Room Full of Mirrors", "Hear My Train A Comin'" (also known as "Getting My Heart Back Together Again"), and "Hey Baby (New Rising Sun)".  "Room Full of Mirrors" was added to Voodoo Soup in 1995 and all except the live "Hear My Train A Comin'" were included on First Rays of the New Rising Sun in 1997, which were attempts at presenting the double album Hendrix was working on at the time of his death.

Background
Despite the title, Rainbow Bridge was not a soundtrack to the film of the same name but rather a compilation of one live song and studio recordings from a number of sources between 1968 and 1970, including some for his planned but unfinished double album First Rays of the New Rising Sun. "Look Over Yonder" began as "Mr. Bad Luck" while Hendrix was performing in Greenwich Village, New York City, with his group Jimmy James and the Blue Flames in the summer of 1966. The version included on Rainbow Bridge was recorded by the Experience in 1968. "Room Full of Mirrors" had been performed live by the Experience, with one recording appearing on Experience (1971). "Hear My Train A Comin'" is another song that dates back to the Experience.  They had attempted several studio recordings, but these were passed over (along with a version with Cox and Buddy Miles) and a live recording from the first show on May 30, 1970, at the Berkeley Community Theatre was used instead. An edited version appears in the 1971 concert film Jimi Plays Berkeley.

A new studio recording of "Room Full of Mirrors" and "Earth Blues" are two of the few largely completed studio recordings with Cox and Miles, although Mitchell later overdubbed the drum parts on the latter. Two additional songs, "Izabella" and "Stepping Stone" had been released as a single (listed as "Hendrix Band of Gypsys"), but Hendrix wished to rework them for his proposed fourth album.  However, just as "Dolly Dagger" and "Room Full of Mirrors" were withheld from The Cry of Love, these were pulled from the Rainbow Bridge track listing in the final stages. Instead they were used to improve the next posthumous release War Heroes.  "The Star-Spangled Banner" is a 1969 solo studio recording by Hendrix.  The remainder of the songs were recorded with Mitchell and Cox between June and August 1970: "Dolly Dagger", "Pali Gap", and "Hey Baby (New Rising Sun)".

The album was the second to be produced by Eddie Kramer and Mitch Mitchell, with John Jansen assisting. It was released in October 1971 in the US, and the following month in the UK where it reached numbers 15 and 16 respectively in the album charts. The album also peaked at No. 9 on the U.S. Best Selling Soul LP's chart.  "Dolly Dagger" with "The Star-Spangled Banner" as the B-side was released as a single in the US in October 1971.  It appeared at number 74 in the Billboard Hot 100 pop chart.  In 2014, the original Rainbow Bridge album was reissued in both CD and LP formats.

Critical reception 

According to AllMusic's Sean Westergaard, "when Rainbow Bridge was originally released, it was actually among the best of the posthumous Hendrix releases... a mix of excellent, finished studio tracks and a couple of live tracks." In a contemporary review for Rolling Stone magazine, Tony Glover wrote favorably of the songs on side one, particularly the "really majestic version" of "The Star-Spangled Banner". In Christgau's Record Guide: Rock Albums of the Seventies (1981), Robert Christgau said while The Cry of Love (1971) highlighted Hendrix's abilities as a songwriter, Rainbow Bridge showcased his guitar playing:

Track listing
All songs written by Jimi Hendrix, except where noted.

Recording details

Personnel
From the original Reprise LP liner notes (supplemented with details from the First Rays of the New Rising Sun CD booklet):

Band members
Jimi Hendrixlead vocals, guitar, backing vocals on "Dolly Dagger" & "Earth Blues", production, mixing on "Dolly Dagger", "Room Full of Mirrors"
Billy Coxbass guitar on all tracks (except "The Star-Spangled Banner", "Look Over Yonder")
Mitch Mitchelldrums on all tracks (except "The Star-Spangled Banner", "Room Full of Mirrors"), posthumous production

Additional musicians
The Ghetto Fighters  Arthur and Albert Allenbacking vocals on "Dolly Dagger"
Juma Edwards a.k.a. Juma Sultanpercussion on "Dolly Dagger", "Pali Gap", "Hey Baby (The New Rising Sun)"
Buddy Milesdrums on "Room Full of Mirrors", backing vocals on "Earth Blues"
The Ronettes (Veronica Bennett, Estelle Bennett, Nedra Talley)backing vocals on "Earth Blues"
Noel Reddingbass guitar on "Look Over Yonder"

Additional personnel
Michael Jeffreyexecutive production
Eddie Kramerposthumous production, engineering on all tracks (except "Earth Blues", "Look Over Yonder", "Hear My Train A Comin'"), mixing on all tracks
John Jansenposthumous production, mixing on "Earth Blues", "Pali Gap", "Look Over Yonder", "Hey Baby (The New Rising Sun)"
Tony Bongioviengineering on "Room Full of Mirrors"
Angel Balestierengineering on "Look Over Yonder"
Abe Jacobengineering on "Hear My Train A Comin'"
The Pineal Playhousealbum design
Daniel Tahaneystill photography

Notes
Citations

References

External links 
 

1971 compilation albums
Jimi Hendrix compilation albums
Albums produced by Jimi Hendrix
Albums produced by Eddie Kramer
Albums recorded at Electric Lady Studios
Compilation albums published posthumously
Reprise Records compilation albums